The table below shows all results of Subaru World Rally Team in World Rally Championship.

External links

ewrc-results.com

Subaru
World Rally Championship constructor results